M.F. Horn 3 (stylized M.F. Horn|3) is an album by Canadian jazz trumpeter Maynard Ferguson. After Ferguson moved from England to the U.S. in 1973, his band changed, as British members were replaced by American musicians, primarily from colleges. The album was produced by Mike Smith and Teo Macero.

Critical reception 

The third installment in the "M.F. Horn" series features some of Ferguson's first experiments with funk in a big band setting, which excited some and confused others. As one reviewer said, "the music on this album is an exciting reminder of just how diverse the music scene really was during the early to mid-'70s, even if pigeonholers didn't yet have a controllable category for some of the sounds that were in the air at that time."

Reissues
In 2007, M.F. Horn 3 was reissued by Wounded Bird Records.

Track listing

Personnel 
 Maynard Ferguson – trumpet, flugelhorn, superbone
 Mike Davis – trumpet, flugelhorn
 Alan Downey – trumpet, flugelhorn
 Tony Mabbett – trumpet, flugelhorn
 Terry Noonan – trumpet, flugelhorn
 Adrian Drover – trombone
 Billy Graham – trombone
 Geoff Wright – trombone
 Andy MacIntosh – alto saxophone
 Tony Buchanan – tenor saxophone
 Bruce Johnstone – baritone saxophone
 Pete Jackson – piano
 Dave Markee – bass guitar
 Randy Jones – drums
 Ray Cooper – percussion
 Vimu Macunda – veena

References

1973 albums
Albums produced by Teo Macero
Big band albums
Columbia Records albums
Maynard Ferguson albums